Concordia is a municipality in the south west of the Honduran department of Olancho, north of Campamento, west of Juticalpa and south of Guayape and Salamá.

Demographics
At the time of the 2013 Honduras census, Concordia municipality had a population of 8,188. Of these, 96.93% were Mestizo, 2.28% White, 0.64% Black or Afro-Honduran and 0.15% Indigenous.

References

Municipalities of the Olancho Department